Městský stadion Karviná is a football stadium in Karviná-Ráj in the Czech Republic. It is the home stadium of MFK Karviná. The stadium holds 4,833 spectators, all of which can be seated.

External links
Information at MFK Karviná website
Stadium information

Football venues in the Czech Republic
MFK Karviná
Sports venues in the Moravian-Silesian Region
Czech First League venues
Sports venues completed in 1952
1952 establishments in Czechoslovakia
20th-century architecture in the Czech Republic